Barry Wong (20 November 1946 – 16 October 1991), also known as Wong Ping-Yiu (黃炳耀), was a Hong Kong screenwriter, film producer and actor. He was hailed as one of the most prolific screenwriters of Hong Kong cinema penning scripts for some of the top filmmakers and actors during the 1980s and early 1990s. Wong died from a heart attack on 16 October 1991 while on a trip to Berlin, Germany.

Career
Wong wrote scripts for films ranging from action to comedy. As an actor, Wong was known for his supporting roles, often wearing his horn-rimmed glasses.

During his career, he had collaborated with Tsui Hark, Stephen Chow, Eric Tsang, Sammo Hung, Danny Lee, John Woo, Jackie Chan and Wong Jing. John Woo's cult action film Hard Boiled was dedicated to him after his death.

Filmography

Writer

Read Lips (1980)     
The Prodigal Son (1981)
The Daring Age (1981)
The Gold-Hunters (1981)
Carry On Pickpocket (1982)
Dragon Lord (1982)
A Fist Full of Talons (1983)
Winners and Sinners (1983)
The Dead and the Deadly (1983)
Double Trouble (1984)
Silent Romance (1984)
The Other Side of Gentleman (1984)
Heart of the Dragon (1985)
Friendly Ghost (1985)
Funny Triple (1985)
Yes, Madam (1985)
Mr. Vampire (1985)
Twinkle, Twinkle, Lucky Stars (1985)
The Intellectual Trio (1985)
Funny Face (1985)
Affectionately Yours (1985)
My Lucky Stars (1985)
Millionaires Express (1986)
Righting Wrongs (1986)
Mr. Vampire II (1986)
Lucky Stars Go Places (1986)
Rosa (1986)
Shyly Joker (1986)
Where's Officer Tuba? (1986)
Eastern Condors (1987)
The Haunted Cop Shop II (1988)
Love Soldier of Fortune (1988)
18 Times (1988)
Mr. Smart (1989)
Pedicab Driver (1989)
Vampire Buster (1989)
Lost Souls (1989)
City Cops (1989)
Encounters of the Spooky Kind II (1990)
Island of Fire (1990)
She Shoots Straight (1990)
Pantyhose Hero (1990)
Outlaw Brothers (1990)
Family Honor (1990)
The Fortune Code (1990)
Whampoa Blues (1990)
Alan & Eric: Between Hello and Goodbye (1991)
Scheming Wonders (1991)
Fight Back to School (1991)
The Gods Must Be Crazy III (1991)
Slickers vs Killers (1991)
The Banquet (1991)
Lethal Contact (1992)
Operation Scorpio (1992)
Twin Dragons (1992)
Hard Boiled (1992)
Fun and Fury (1992)
A Kid from Tibet (1992)
Ghost Punting (1992)

Actor
Winners and Sinners (1983) - Announcer
The Other Side of Gentleman (1984) - Father Tam
Chou xiao ya (1985)
Lucky Stars Go Places (1986) - Police Officer at Meeting #1
Mang gwai hok tong (1988) - Senior Inspector
Lie ying ji hua (1988)
The Killer (1989) - Chief Insp. Dou / Tu
Vampire Buster (1989) - Pedestrian watching TV
Lung joi tin ngai (1989) - Drug Dealer
Family Honor (1990) - Internal Affairs Officer
Curry and Pepper (1990) - Chow
Huang jia du chuan (1990) - King of Gambling
Yeh moh sin sang (1990) - Chef
Peng dang (1990)
Island of Fire (1990) - Inspector Wong
Alan & Eric: Between Hello and Goodbye (1991) - Alan's Boss
To hok wai lung (1991) - Scissor Legs
Zei sheng (1991)
God of Gamblers III: Back to Shanghai (1991) - Police Commissioner Wong
The Banquet (1991) - Man at Table
Tao xue ying xiong zhuan (1992) - Police Commissioner Wong
Te yi gong neng xing qiu ren (1992)
Ji de... xiang jiao cheng shu shi (1993) - James Wong / The Killer (final film role)

References

External links
 

Hong Kong screenwriters
Hong Kong film producers
Hong Kong male actors
1946 births
1991 deaths
20th-century Hong Kong male actors
People from Wuzhou
Screenwriters from Guangxi
Male actors from Guangxi
20th-century screenwriters